Sophora cassioides is a legume tree native to Chile.

Distribution
It is an endemic from South Chile and Gough Island. In South America it is found between Constitución and Puyuhuapi. It prefers shady places in Myrtaceae stands, alongside Drimys, Caldcluvia, and other hygrophyllous species. Putative hybrids with Sophora macrocarpa have been described at Bullileo (Linares). It is also found in coastal areas associated with the Peumus boldus–Persea lingue alliance.

Phylogeny
Sophora represents a polyphyletic assemblage. Series Tetrapterae (sensu Tsoong & Ma), including Sophora cassioides and Sophora macrocarpa, forms a monophyletic group with Eurasian species like as Sophora flavescens Ait. and Asian Sophora alopecuroides L., suggesting a west or northwest Pacific origin. The genus Sophora is estimated to have arrived in New Zealand 9.6–8.9 million years ago (in the Neogene).

Notes and references

cassioides
Trees of Chile
Near threatened plants